Pablo Ignacio Cárdenas Baeza (born 10 February 2000) is a Chilean footballer who plays as a defender for Chilean Primera División side Cobresal.

Career
As a child, Cárdenas was with Colo-Colo youth team.

Personal life
His father is Peruvian. So, he could be eligible to play for Peru.

References

External links
 

2000 births
Living people
Chilean people of Peruvian descent
Footballers from Santiago
Chilean footballers
Chilean Primera División players
Cobresal footballers
Association football defenders